Weyauwega can refer to:
 Weyauwega, Wisconsin, a city in Waupaca County, Wisconsin, United States
 Weyauwega (town), Wisconsin, a town in Waupaca County, Wisconsin, United States